Redington Shores is a town in Pinellas County, Florida, United States. The county is part of the Tampa–St. Petersburg–Clearwater, Florida Metropolitan Statistical Area. The population was 2,121 at the 2010 census.

Geography

Redington Shores is located at  (27.827965, –82.830509).

According to Elevation Map Logs, the elevation of Redington Shores is just one meter above sea level.

Demographics

As of the census of 2000, there were 2,338 people, 1,292 households, and 658 families residing in the town. The racial makeup of the town was 97.60% White, 0.21% African American, 0.47% Native American, 0.47% Asian, 0.30% from other races, and 0.94% from two or more races. Hispanic or Latino of any race were 2.95% of the population.

There were 1,292 households, out of which 8.9% had children under the age of 18 living with them, 43.5% were married couples living together, 5.2% had a female householder with no husband present, and 49.0% were non-families. 41.3% of all households were made up of individuals, and 20.0% had someone living alone who was 65 years of age or older.  The average household size was 1.81 and the average family size was 2.38.

In the town, the population was spread out, with 9.2% under the age of 18, 3.1% from 18 to 24, 19.7% from 25 to 44, 34.0% from 45 to 64, and 34.0% who were 65 years of age or older.  The median age was 55 years. For every 100 females, there were 95.2 males.  For every 100 females age 18 and over, there were 94.6 males.

The median income for a household in the town was $40,411, and the median income for a family was $49,300. Males had a median income of $36,719 versus $30,662 for females. The per capita income for the town was $31,822.  About 5.5% of families and 8.2% of the population were below the poverty line, including 14.6% of those under age 18 and 8.3% of those age 65 or over.

Climate 
Redington Shores is located in a subtropical climate. The weather is consistently humid and has high temperatures. According to Weather Underground, the historical average day temperature is 79.7 degrees Fahrenheit, with the high averaging around 88.3 degrees and the low being 71.9 degrees. Redington Shores faces high wind speeds averaging around 9 miles per hour. The close proximity to the ocean brings a recurring ocean breeze that cools the beach area.

Ecology 
Redington Shores is home to numerous plants and organisms which thrive around the beach and ocean. Plants on the beach include mangroves, sea oats, and sea grapes. All of these organisms prevent erosion on the dunes and are essential to organisms around them. The mangroves are protected due to the State’s “Mangrove Trimming and Preservation Act.”A population of coyotes and loggerhead turtles can be found in Redington Shores.

Karenia brevis, red tide, causes problems in the ocean at Redington Shores. An increase of this organism in the ocean causes harm to organisms around it. Due to the high concentration of K. brevis in the Gulf of Mexico, Redington Shores faces problems with deadly impacts on marine life.

Library

The community is served by the Gulf Beaches Public Library, located in nearby Madeira Beach. The library is supported by Madeira Beach, Redington Beach, North Redington Beach, Redington Shores, and Treasure Island. These five communities have combined their resources in order to fund the library.

References

External links
Town of Redington Shores official website

Towns in Pinellas County, Florida
Towns in Florida
Populated coastal places in Florida on the Gulf of Mexico
Beaches of Pinellas County, Florida
Beaches of Florida